Tommaso di Maria Allery, marchese di Monterosato (27 June 1841 – 1 March 1927) was an Italian malacologist.

He was born in Palermo, Italy, in 1841 and died there in 1927. He became a distinguished scholar of the Mollusca in the Mediterranean, appreciated by students of malacology from around the world.

Despite his reluctance to research in the field, he collected a considerable amount of specimens to be studied in collaboration with other scholars. During his many travels in Italy and abroad, he kept many contacts with  famous malacologists.

His scientific production was of considerable importance. He described many new species, enumerated the Mediterranean shells and studied the fossil deposits of Mount Pellegrino. According to the World Register of Marine Species (WoRMS) he has named 345 marine species, many of which have become synonyms

Species named after Monterosato
The following marine species were named after Monterosato, many of which have become synonyms 
 Acicularia monterosatoi De Boury MS, Monterosato, 1890 : synonym of Melanella pyramidalis (Sowerby, 1866)
 Acteon monterosatoi Dautzenberg, 1889
 Buccinum monterosatoi Locard, 1886 : synonym of Buccinum humphreysianum Bennet, 1824
 Cadulus monterosatoi Locard, 1897
 Coralliophila monterosatoi (Locard, 1897)
 Daronia monterosatoi van Aartsen & Bogi, 1986 : synonym of Rugulina monterosatoi (van Aartsen & Bogi, 1986)
 Granigyra monterosatoi (van Aartsen & Bogi, 1986): synonym of Rugulina monterosatoi (van Aartsen & Bogi, 1986)
 Lepidochitona monterosatoi Kaas & Van Belle, 1981
 Melanella monterosatoi (Monterosato, 1890): synonym of Melanella pyramidalis (Sowerby, 1866)
 Octopus monterosatoi Fra Piero, 1895
 Philine monterosatoi (Sykes, 1905)
 Pleurotoma monterosatoi Locard, 1897: synonym of Spirotropis monterosatoi (Locard, 1897)
 Polygireulima monterosatoi : synonym of Melanella monterosatoi (Monterosato, 1890) : synonym of Melanella pyramidalis (Sowerby, 1866)
 Roxania monterosatoi Dautzenberg & H. Fischer, 1896
 Rugulina monterosatoi (van Aartsen & Bogi, 1986)
 Scala monterosatoi de Boury, 1890 : synonym of Cylindriscala acus (Watson, 1883)
 Spirotropis monterosatoi (Locard, 1897)
 Turritella monterosatoi Kobelt, 1887: synonym of Turritella turbona Monterosato, 1877
Others were given names with epithets based on his name Allery 
 Chrysallida alleryi (Kobelt, 1903): synonym of Chrysallida monterosatii (Clessin, 1900)
 Evalea alleryi F. Nordsieck, 1972: synonym of  Ondina scandens (Monterosato, 1884)
 Rissoa alleryi (Nordsieck, 1972)
 Solatisonax alleryi (Seguenza G., 1876)

Bibliography
 1872   Notizie intorno alle conchiglie mediterranee 
 1875. Nuova rivista delle conchiglie Mediterranee. - Atti della Reale Accademia di Scienze, Lettere e Arti di Palermo (2a) 5: 1-50. Palermo.
 1878. Enumerazione e sinonimia delle conchiglie mediterranee. - Giornale di Scienze Naturali ed Economiche 13: 61-115. Palermo.
 1879. Enumerazione e sinonimia delle conchiglie mediterranee. Monografia dei chitonidi del Mediterraneo. - Giornale di Scienze Naturali ed Economiche 14: 9-31. Palermo
 1884  Nomenclatura generica e specifica di alcune conchiglie Mediterranee. - pp. 1–152. Palermo. 
 1889 Nomenclatura generica e specifica di alcune conchiglie mediterranee
 1892  Molluschi terrestri delle isole adiacenti alla Sicilia. - Atti della Reale Accademia di Scienze, Lettere e Belle Arti di Palermo (3) 2: 1-33, [1].
 1894  Conchiglie terrestri viventi e fossili di Monte Pellegrino. - Il Naturalista Siciliano 13 (9): 165-173. Palermo.
 1906  Articolo sulle Auriculidae, Assiminidae [sic] e Truncatellidae dei mari d'Europa. - Il Naturalista Siciliano 18: 125-130. Palermo.

References 

 H. Crosse, 1884.  [Tiberi collection acquired by Monterosato].  Journal de Conchyliologie 31(4): 288. 
 P. Dautzenberg, 1928.  Nécrologie. Marquis de Monterosato (1841-1927).  Journal de Conchyliologie 72(1): 69-73.
 F. Cipolla, 1930.  Tommaso Di Maria Alleri, Marchese di Monterosato.  Giornale de Scienze Naturali ed Economiche (Palermo) 35(1): 33-42 [biography, partial bibliography]. 
 J. R. le B. Tomlin, 1930.  Obituary notice: Marchese di Monterosato.  Journal of Conchology 19(2): 37-40 [bibliography]. 
 P. Piani, 1981.  Bibliografia cronologica degli scritti malacologici di Monterosato. Bollettino Malacologico 17(7-8): 201-204. 
 P. Piani, 1983. Della “Collezione Monterosato”, di G. S. Coen e di altre cose ancora.  Bollettino Malacologico 19(9-12): 273-278. 
 R. G. Giannuzzi Savelli, 1982-1989.  Opera Omnia [of Tommaso di Maria Marchese di Monterosato].  Palermo, Italy: Unione Malacologica Italiana, 4 vols. [a reprint of all of Monterosato’s works.  1: xvi + 370 pp. (1982); 2: 371-814 (1983); 3: 815-1186 (1984); 4: 1187-1793 (1989) 
 R. Giannuzzi Savelli & P. Piani, 1990.  Revisione nomenclaturale dei taxa specifici Monterosatiani.  Lavori del Società Italiana di Malacologia 23: 141-199. 
 M. Olivero & L. P. Tringali, 2001. The types of marine molluscan species described by Monterosato, in the Museo Civico di Zoologia, Roma. General scope of the work and part 1: the opisthobranch gastropods. Bollettino Malacologico 37(5-8): 121-142
 K.-H. Beckmann, 2001.  A bibliographic addition to the complete works of Tomasso di Maria Marchese di Monterosato (1841-1927).  Schriften zur Malakozoologie 17: 44.
 M. Appolloni, C. Smriglio, B. Amati, L. Lugliè, I. Nofroni, L.P. Tringali, P. Mariottini & M. Oliverio, 2018. Catalogue of the primary types of marine molluscan taxa described by Tommaso Allery Di Maria, Marquis of Monterosato, deposited in the Museo Civico di Zoologia, Roma. Zootaxa, 4477 (1): 1-138. DOI: https://dx.doi.org/10.11646/zootaxa.4477.1.1

External links 
  Tommaso Allery Di Maria, marchese di Monterosato

Italian malacologists
Italian zoologists
1841 births
1927 deaths